Darkwater: Voices from Within the Veil is a literary work by W.E.B. Du Bois. Published in 1920, the text incorporates autobiographical information as well as essays, spirituals, and poems that were all written by Du Bois himself.

Writing
Written when he was 50, Darkwater is the first of Du Bois's three autobiographies and was followed by Dusk of Dawn: An Autobiography of a Race Concept, and The Autobiography of W. E. B. Du Bois: A Soliloquy on Viewing My Life from the Last Decade of its First Century.

Du Bois maintained that the book was written to develop an understanding of the complications of the color-line with emphasis on its political implications.
 “I venture to write again on themes on which great souls have already said greater words, in the hope that I may strike here and there a half-tone, newer even if slighter, up from the heart of my problem and the problems of my people.”

Contents
An overarching theme of this work is the unifying character of labor, and its contrast with traditional conflict between historical identities. Usually this is cast in terms of conflict between white and black workers, but with some variation. For example:

Several of its essays are personal in nature, with obvious emotional rhetoric.  The style maintains a religious tone and his spirituality is a common thread in many of the individual essays.  Described in varying tones of black and brown, a Christ-like figure of racial hope is prevalent, signifying the coming moment of racial confrontation and eventual salvation. This figure is one which Du Bois characterizes as the bearer of eternal freedom from discrimination, poverty, and from the color line itself. The stories within Darkwater also revolve around discontent with the way that democracy was viewed and handled among people of different ethnic, racial, and social groups.

The chapter structure of Darkwater follows a consistent pattern of a narrative section and a poetic section, both within one chapter. The narrative sections are frequently autobiographical or are otherwise works of speculative fiction.  In this text Du Bois compiles previously written works from The Atlantic, The Independent, The Crisis, and the Journal of Race Development.

In his chapter called "The Damnation of Women," Du Bois seeks to elevate women by acknowledging their labor in the home, the workplace and the black church. The chapter has been described as one of the first proto-feminist analyses by a male intellectual. In the chapter, Du Bois gives the black mother even more glorification for her role as child bearer. He calls for women to seek a life of economic independence, and argues that women have a right to control their own bodies and reproductive choices. Yet in his description of women he often describes their physical traits first such as his description of journalist Mary Shadd Cary whom Du Bois described as a "ravishing dream-born beauty."

Credo
Darkwater opens with  "Credo", which was frequently reprinted in contexts other than within the book. It was written in style similar to a Christian creed and was his statement of faith and vision for change. "Credo" was widely read and recited.

It begins with the prophetic statement

I believe in God who made of one blood all races that dwell on earth. I believe that all men, black and brown and white, are brothers, varying, through Time and Opportunity, in form and gift and feature, but differing in no essential particular, and alike in soul and in the possibility of infinite development.

and later speaks to freedom and dreams

I believe in Liberty for all men; the space to stretch their arms and their souls; the right to breathe and the right to vote, the freedom to choose their friends, enjoy the sunshine and ride on the railroads, uncursed by color; thinking, dreaming, working as they will in a kingdom of God and love.

Reception
Darkwater: Voices From Within the Veil was well received by audiences after it was first published, helping to open the eyes of readers to the problems of racial discrimination in America. In his review of Darkwater in the popular magazine The Survey Robert Foerster writes, “Actually it is a book so skillfully put together, so passionately felt, so lyrically expressed, that it will be read widely.”

References

Works by W. E. B. Du Bois
1920 books
Harcourt (publisher) books